The Brigham City Utah Temple is a temple of the Church of Jesus Christ of Latter-day Saints (LDS Church) in Brigham City, Utah. The temple was announced by church president Thomas S. Monson on October 3, 2009, during the church's general conference. The temple was announced concurrently with those to be constructed in Concepción, Chile, Fort Lauderdale, Florida, Fortaleza, Brazil and Sapporo, Japan; at the time, the announcement brought the total number of temples worldwide to 151 (including those under construction and announced). It is the fourteenth temple of the LDS Church completed in Utah.

The temple is located on the property where the Central Elementary School once stood at 250 South Main Street in Brigham City, across from the historic tabernacle.

A groundbreaking ceremony was held on July 31, 2010, and was conducted by Boyd K. Packer, president of the Quorum of the Twelve Apostles and a native of Brigham City.

On the morning of June 28, 2011, the western spire was installed. The angel Moroni statue was installed on the eastern tower on July 12, 2011. The installation was delayed for almost two hours due to weather problems.

A public open house was held from August 18 through September 15, 2012, excluding Sundays and Saturdays. The temple was formally dedicated in three sessions on September 23, 2012, by Packer. The dedicatory sessions were broadcast to congregations of the church within Utah. In conjunction with the dedication of the temple, there was a cultural celebration featuring music and dance on September 22.

See also

 The Church of Jesus Christ of Latter-day Saints in Utah
 Comparison of temples of The Church of Jesus Christ of Latter-day Saints
 List of temples of The Church of Jesus Christ of Latter-day Saints
 List of temples of The Church of Jesus Christ of Latter-day Saints by geographic region
 Temple architecture (Latter-day Saints)

References

External links
 
 Brigham City Utah Temple Official site
 Brigham City Utah Temple at ChurchofJesusChristTemples.org
 Oral Histories about the building and opening of the Brigham City Utah Temple from the Brigham City Museum-Gallery and Brigham City Library

Buildings and structures in Brigham City, Utah
Temples (LDS Church) in Utah
2012 establishments in Utah
Temples (LDS Church) completed in 2012
2012 in Christianity